The Thames Water Abingdon Reservoir is the South East Strategic Reservoir Option (SESRO) being promoted by the Water Resources in the South East (WRSE) group (15 November 2022) to jointly supply water to the South East water companies of Affinity Water, Southern Water and Thames Water.  It is not Thames Water’s reservoir, or indeed solely for Thames Water’s use.

Proposals
The proposal arose in 2006 by Thames Water. In 2007 the Environment Agency opined that need for this was not proven. Further arguments were put but the near-term-demand case was rejected in 2011. 

Since 2018 a longer-term proposal stands, for its building, by 2043 to cater to projected population growth in the Thames Basin.

Reasons for the construction 

The main reason to build is that the South-East is facing significant seasonal water stress. Factors are the rain shadow behind the prevailing westerly winds and western hills. Eastern counties lack the rainfall of the west; their average annual rainfall being 500-750mm. The west receives around 1800-2800mm. 

Average population density is higher in the eastern than western counties; London houses 13.5% of the UK's population. This is the greatest concentration of domestic water usage. Roughly 22% of water use is domestic; 75% is from all types of industry.

Counter-arguments 
GARD or the 'Group Against Reservoir Development' have counter-arguments, local, national and looking at international comparators.
Thames Water have unambitious targets for leakages
The reservoir will be far from potent against long droughts
As there is enough water to supply London now there can be in future using other, sustainable methods. 
Impacts on the ecosystem being transformed from supporting many endangered and protected land-based invertebrates, water voles, bats and hedgehogs to more water-based bird life.
Traffic congestion and construction pollution.
Local economic loss of many well-rooted businesses and a solar farm.
A new, low, risk of flooding.

References

See also
 Thames Water

Abingdon-on-Thames
Abingdon